Paddy Waters may refer to:

 Paddy Waters (footballer), Irish soccer player
 Paddy Waters (hurler), Irish hurler